The Faith Instinct: How Religion Evolved and Why It Endures is a 2009 book about the evolution of religious behavior by New York Times science reporter Nicholas Wade, in which the author argues that religious behaviours have evolved through natural selection. Wade argues that religious behaviour, through shared gods and beliefs, creates social solidarity, which is the driving force in making groups of people who are not related to each other by family, comply with and enforce shared norms and rules for social behaviour, that are not beneficial on an individual level, but beneficial for the tribe as a whole. Wade argues that the selection for religious behaviour began at least 50,000 years ago between African tribes, where tribes that benefited more from the unifying power of shared gods and beliefs, music and dance, outcompeted rivals and thus left more survivors, whereby genes underlying a brain-based “faith instinct” proliferated, which caused religious tendencies to be ingrained in the human brain. 

2009 non-fiction books
American non-fiction books
Anthropology books
Books about evolution
Books about evolutionary psychology
Books about sociobiology
Books by Nicholas Wade
English-language books
Penguin Books books
Sociology books